The Zambia men's national field hockey team is the national team representing Zambia in field hockey.

Tournament record

Africa Cup of Nations
6th - 1983

Africa Games
Qualified - 2022

See also
Zambia women's national field hockey team

References

field hockey
African men's national field hockey teams
National team